Catherine Virlouvet (born 13 February 1956) is a French historian, a professor of economic and social history of ancient Rome. In 2011, she was appointed director of the École française de Rome, the first woman ever to hold that post.

Career 
A member of the École française de Rome (1983–1986), she was maître de conférences of ancient history at the university of Rouen then director of studies of the ancient section of antiquities of the École française de Rome (1993–1999). She was appointed a professor of ancient history at the Aix-Marseille University in 1999, and heads the École française de Rome since September 2011. A student of Claude Nicolet, she specialized in economic and social history of Rome at the end of the Republic and under the High Empire.

Publications

Books 
1995: Tessera frumentaria. Les procédures de la distribution de blé public à Rome, École française de Rome
2001: Famines et émeutes à Rome des origines de la république à la mort de Néron, École française de Rome
2009: La plèbe frumentaire dans les témoignages épigraphiques : essai d’histoire sociale et administrative du peuple de Rome antique, École française de Rome
2004: (Co-direction) Nourrir les cités de la Méditerranée. Antiquité-Temps modernes, avec B. Marin, Maisonneuve & Larose, Maison méditerranéenne des sciences de l’homme, Paris, 894 p. .

Articles 
2000: Les denrées alimentaires dans les archives des Sulpicii de Pouzzoles, Cahiers Glotz, XI, (pp. 131–149)
2001: La tribu des soldats originaires de Rome, Mélanges de l'École française de Rome 113, 2, (pp. 735–752)

Recordings 
 Le peuple de Rome, émission de Vincent Charpentier, "Le salon noir", France Culture, 27.03.2013, 27 min, online.

References

External links 
 Catherine Virlouvet on the site of the École française de Rome
 Catherine Virlouvet, La plèbe frumentaire dans les témoignages épigraphiques on Hypothèses.org
  Catherine Virlouvet, Tessera frumentaria : les procédures de la distribution de blé public à Rome. (compte rendu) on Persée

1956 births
Living people
21st-century French historians
French scholars of Roman history
Women classical scholars
ENS Fontenay-Saint-Cloud-Lyon alumni
French women historians
21st-century French women